"Pourtant" is a 1989 pop-ballad song recorded by Canadian singer Roch Voisine. It was released in March 1990 as the second single from his first studio album Hélène, on which it appears as the third track. It became a top three hit in France.

Versions
"Pourtant" was performed during Voisine's 1992 tour and thus included on the live albums Europe Tour and Roch Voisine Live, as well as on the compilation Best Of. Voisine recorded a new version of "Pourtant" first in 2003 on his album Je te serai fidèle, then in 2013 as a duet with Robert Marien, on the Canadian edition of his album Duophonique.

Chart performance
In France, "Pourtant" debuted at number 17 on the chart edition of 7 April 1991, then entered the top ten two weeks later, had a peak at number three in its sixth week, and remained for a total of eight weeks in the top ten and 14 weeks in the top 50. It achieved Silver status, awarded by the Syndicat National de l'Édition Phonographique. On the European Hot 100 Singles, it debuted at number 61 on 21 April 1991, reached a peak of number 13 in the sixth week, and fell off the top 100 after 13 weeks of presence.

Track listings
 12" maxi
 "Pourtant" — 5:40
 "Hélène" (English version) — 3:45
 "Pour une victoire" — 3:02

 7" single
 "Pourtant" — 5:40
 "Pourtant" (instrumental) — 4:22

 CD maxi
 "Pourtant" — 5:40
 "Pour une victoire" — 3:02
 "Pourtant" (instrumental) — 4:22

Charts

Weekly charts

Year-end charts

Certifications

Release history

References

1990 singles
Roch Voisine songs
1989 songs